The Conroy Skymonster (CL-44-0) is a 1960s United States specialized cargo aircraft based on the Canadair CL-44 freighter, with an outsize fuselage.

Design and development 
The aircraft was designed by John M. Conroy as a transport aircraft that could be used to ferry three Rolls-Royce RB.211 jet engines from Belfast, Northern Ireland, to Palmdale, California, United States. The engines were to be installed on the Lockheed L-1011 TriStar airliner.

The Skymonster was derived from a Canadair CL-44 freighter, in turn a derivative of the Bristol Britannia.  It features an enlarged fuselage, like the Aero Spacelines Mini Guppy, which was produced by Jack Conroy's previous company, Aero Spacelines.

The conversion was performed outdoors, under covered scaffolding, at the Santa Barbara California airport. The nose section was built using foam covered with fiberglass, while the larger fuselage was constructed using conventional aluminum structure.

Operational history 
The Skymonster first flew on 26 November 1969, under the US registration "N447T". The CL-44 from which it had been converted also bore this same registration, and was previously operated by the Flying Tiger Line.

Only one prototype was built. Another one was ordered, but the CL-44 on which it was to be based crashed before delivery.

In 1970, the prototype was leased by Transmeridian Air Cargo, who gave it the name "Skymonster". Despite its being renamed "Bahamas Trader" later on, the name Skymonster stuck, and it is now commonly known as this.

In 1978, it was bought by British Cargo Airlines.

In 1982, it went to HeavyLift Cargo Airlines, who re-registered it with the Irish registration EI-BND.

The aircraft went into storage in 1993, but was bought by a leasing company only two months later and leased to Buffalo Airways. According to Mikey McBryan General Manager for Buffalo Airways in Yellowknife Canada, this Buffalo Airways was a different operator and had no connection to the Canadian company.

Its next lease was to Azerbaijan Airlines in 1997, under the registration 4K-GUP.

In March 1998, it was leased to Baku Express.

In August 1998 it went to First International Airlines and was registered 9G-LCA.

In 1999, it was placed into storage, initially in the US, but then it was flown to Bournemouth Airport, UK, where it was scheduled to be scrapped.

In December 2006 the aircraft was registered in the Philippines (RP-C8023) and was being prepared for service in Australia. As of March 2008, the Skymonster was still at Hurn. In August 2008, it was reported that the aircraft was in the process of being scrapped, however as of September this was on hold amid further rumours about donation to a museum in Germany.

On 14 January 2010, Bournemouth International Airport Limited offered the aircraft for sale in The London Gazette.

After a long period of storage, activity was again seen around the Skymonster during the summer of 2013. In July 2013 it was registered N447FT in the United States to a Jordan Harlan Wayne, but has since been deregistered.

As of 21 May 2021 the Skymonster remains at Bournemouth International Airport, moved from its original parking spot to make way for airport development.

See also
 Super Guppy
 Boeing 747 Large Cargo Freighter
 Airbus Beluga
 Aviation Traders ATL-98 Carvair

References

 William Patrick Dean The “Skymonster” Conroy CL-44 Guppy Fate Remains In Limbo

External links

 All About Guppys
 The Canadair CL44

1960s United States cargo aircraft
Skymonster
Four-engined tractor aircraft
Low-wing aircraft
Four-engined turboprop aircraft
Aircraft first flown in 1969